The Midnight Warning is a 1932 American mystery film directed by Spencer Gordon Bennet and starring William 'Stage' Boyd, Claudia Dell and Huntley Gordon. The film is also known as Eyes of Mystery (new American title).

Plot
A sister & brother check into a posh hotel. Shortly thereafter, the brother is missing, & despite the sister's inquiries, no one admits to ever having seen the man. Meanwhile, a sniper shoots bullets through the window of the room that the brother & sister stayed in. Is there any connection between these events? That's the mystery.

Cast
 William 'Stage' Boyd as Thorwaldt Cornish 
 Claudia Dell as Enid Van Buren 
 Huntley Gordon as Mr. Gordon 
 John Harron as Erich
 Hooper Atchley as Dr. Steven Walcott 
 Lloyd Whitlock as Rankin 
 Phillips Smalley as Dr. Bronson 
 Lloyd Ingraham as Adolph Klein 
 Henry Hall as Dr. Barris

References

Bibliography
 George Eugene Turner & Michael H. Price. Forgotten Horrors: Early Talkie Chillers from Poverty Row. A. S. Barnes, 1979.

External links

1932 films
1932 mystery films
American mystery films
1930s English-language films
Films directed by Spencer Gordon Bennet
Mayfair Pictures films
1930s American films